"Barwick Green"  is the theme music to the long-running BBC Radio 4 soap opera The Archers. A "maypole dance" from the suite My Native Heath written in 1924 by the Yorkshire composer Arthur Wood, it is named after Barwick-in-Elmet in Yorkshire's West Riding.

The recording used between 1950 and the 1990s was played by Sidney Torch and his orchestra. Sidney Torch recorded a commercial version of "Barwick Green" in the 1950s, but it was not used on The Archers itself.

The familiar opening 7 notes are echoed in the pizzicato in Benjamin Britten's Simple Symphony, written in 1934.

The Sunday omnibus broadcast of The Archers starts with a more rustic, accordion-arranged rendition by The Yetties, while BBC Radio 4 Extra's former spinoff, Ambridge Extra, used a version arranged by Bellowhead.

References

Radio theme songs
The Archers
Light music compositions
1924 compositions